Bad Company is a 2002 action comedy film directed by Joel Schumacher, produced by Jerry Bruckheimer and starring Chris Rock and Anthony Hopkins. The film became somewhat famous for its connections to the September 11th terrorist attacks; amongst other things, it was the last major production to film inside the former World Trade Center. The film plot, written years before the attacks, involved a variety of Serbo-Balkan extremists (including a man from Afghanistan) planning a huge attack in New York City. The film's release date was moved out of its late 2001 spot and into a summer 2002 release, similar to several other films with terrorism or violent crime-related stories, including Collateral Damage.

Plot
When a mission to retrieve a stolen suitcase bomb goes awry, Central Intelligence Agency (CIA) agent Kevin Pope is killed. Pope was working undercover as an antiquities dealer under the name Michael Turner. The CIA, which is desperate to complete the mission, discovers that Agent Pope had a twin brother, Jake Hayes, from whom he was separated at birth; their mother died giving birth and Hayes suffered from a severe lung infection that prompted the doctors to separate them because they felt that Hayes was unlikely to live for very long. Hayes hustles chess games, scalps tickets and works at small clubs in Jersey City, New Jersey to make ends meet. Meanwhile, Hayes's girlfriend, Julie grows tired of waiting for him to grow up and decides to move to Seattle, Washington.

After the CIA successfully persuades Hayes to participate and begins to train Hayes for a mission that is to take place in Prague, Czech Republic, they are initially dismayed by his lack of refinement. Agent Oakes confronts Hayes, telling him he does not trust him. When Hayes begins paying attention, the CIA sets him up in his brother's old apartment in Manhattan to test him and try to bait the men who killed his brother. Hayes is attacked, but escapes unharmed. Looking for a way out, Hayes goes to his foster mother only to be found by Oakes, who persuades him to finish the mission.

After arriving in Prague, Hayes - posing as his dead brother - meets with the men selling the suitcase bomb. The seller, Adrik Vas is an ex-Russian Army Colonel with ties to the Russian Mafia. When they return to their hotel, Hayes is greeted by his brother's ex-girlfriend Nicole. Believing Hayes is his brother, she dines with him and returns to his hotel, where the couple is ambushed by rival buyers. Nicole figures out that Hayes is not his brother and returns to her assignment covering the Balkans for CNN.

Hayes and Oakes meet with Vas and are able to steal the arming codes. Just as they close the deal, Vas' men double cross them with the rival buyer. When the rival dealers, who are part of a multi-national terrorist organization, learn they cannot detonate the bomb because of the missing codes, they kidnap Julie. Hayes gives himself up trying to save his girlfriend, and the terrorists get the codes back and arm the bomb.

After interrogating one of the captured terrorists, they track the bomb to Grand Central Station. With the clock ticking, they locate the bomb and the terrorist leader Dragan Ađanić, who has started the countdown. Oakes rescues Hayes by killing two terrorists. As Hayes starts to enter the codes to disarm the bomb, Ađanić holds Julie hostage. In order to distract Ađanić, Hayes pretends to shoot Oakes, and they kill Ađanić by shooting him repeatedly. Hayes is able to disarm the bomb just prior to detonation. 

Hayes visits his brother's grave. Later, Oakes approaches Hayes at his wedding to Julie and warns him that a dangerous criminal has escaped from prison and is seeking revenge on Kevin Pope, but since Kevin is dead and Hayes was impersonating him, the criminal thinks Hayes is Kevin. Hayes begins to panic and demands that Oakes protect him, but Oakes laughs as he reveals that it was only a joke and he really just came for the wedding.

Cast

 Anthony Hopkins as CIA Agent Oakes
 Chris Rock as Jake Hayes / CIA Agent Kevin Pope / Michael Turner
 Peter Stormare as Adrik Vas
 Gabriel Macht as CIA Agent Seale
 Kerry Washington as Julie Benson
 Adoni Maropis as Jarma / Dragan Henchman #1
 Garcelle Beauvais as Nicole
 Matthew Marsh as Dragan Ađanić
 Dragan Mićanović as Michelle "The Hammer" Petrov
 John Slattery as CIA Deputy Director Roland Yates
 Brooke Smith as CIA Agent Swanson
 Daniel Sunjata as CIA Agent Carew
 DeVone Lawson Jr. as CIA Agent Parish
 Wills Robbins as CIA Agent McCain
 Marek Vašut as Andre
 Irma P. Hall as Mrs. Banks
 Dan Ziskie as CIA Agent Dempsey
 John Aylward as CIA Agent Ferren
 John Fink as CIA Agent Fink
 Michael Ealy as "G-Mo"
 Shea Whigham as CIA Agent Wells (uncredited)
 Charlie Day as Stoner (uncredited)

Filming locations 
Bad Company was partially filmed in Prague, Czech Republic. The scene where the suitcase bomb was handed over was filmed at Chotěšov Abbey.

Reception

Box office 
Bad Company failed to recoup its budget at the box office, earning only $30,160,161 in the United States and $35,817,134 outside the US for a worldwide total of $65,977,295. The film was originally slated to be released on December 25, 2001 but because of the attacks of September 11, 2001, the film's release was postponed given the fact the film was about a terrorist attack on New York City.

Critical response 
The film was panned by critics. Review aggregation website Rotten Tomatoes gives the film a 10% approval rating based on 135 reviews, with an average score of 3.87/10. The site's critical consensus states [that both] "Chris Rock and Anthony Hopkins fail to generate the sparks necessary to save the movie from a generic and utterly predictable script." Audiences surveyed by CinemaScore gave the film a grade of "B" on scale of A+ to F.

Seattle Post-Intelligencer reviewer William Arnold calls the film "wildly overproduced, inadequately motivated every step of the way and demographically targeted to please every one (and no one)." Roger Ebert remarks in the Chicago Sun-Times that the film "jams too many prefabricated story elements into the running time." On their review show, Ebert and Richard Roeper gave it two thumbs down, arguing that it: 

David Hunter of The Hollywood Reporter noted the film as having "all the familiar Bruckheimer elements, and Schumacher does probably as good a job as anyone at bringing off the Hopkins/Rock collision of acting styles and onscreen personas."

Soundtrack

A soundtrack containing hip hop, alternative and R&B music was released on June 4, 2002 by Hollywood Records. It peaked at number 98 on the Billboard 200 and number 11 on the Top R&B/Hip-Hop Albums.

References

External links
 
 
 

Films about the Central Intelligence Agency
2002 films
2002 action comedy films
2000s spy films
American spy films
American buddy action films
American buddy cop films
2000s English-language films
American action comedy films
2000s spy comedy films
Films directed by Joel Schumacher
Touchstone Pictures films
Films produced by Jerry Bruckheimer
Films about terrorism in the United States
Films about nuclear war and weapons
Films postponed due to the September 11 attacks
Films shot in the Czech Republic
Films shot in New Jersey
Films set in New Jersey
Films shot in New York City
Films scored by Trevor Rabin
Czech action comedy films
Czech spy films
2000s buddy comedy films
2000s buddy cop films
American action thriller films
English-language Czech films
2002 comedy films
2000s American films